The golden-section search is a technique for finding an extremum (minimum or maximum) of a function inside a specified interval. For a strictly unimodal function with an extremum inside the interval, it will find that extremum, while for an interval containing multiple extrema (possibly including the interval boundaries), it will converge to one of them. If the only extremum on the interval is on a boundary of the interval, it will converge to that boundary point. The method operates by successively narrowing the range of values on the specified interval, which makes it relatively slow, but very robust. The technique derives its name from the fact that the algorithm maintains the function values for four points whose three interval widths are in the ratio φ:1:φ where φ is the golden ratio. These ratios are maintained for each iteration and are maximally efficient. Excepting boundary points, when searching for a minimum, the central point is always less than or equal to the outer points, assuring that a minimum is contained between the outer points. The converse is true when searching for a maximum. The algorithm is the limit of Fibonacci search (also described below) for many function evaluations. Fibonacci search and golden-section search were discovered by Kiefer (1953) (see also Avriel and Wilde (1966)).

Basic idea

The discussion here is posed in terms of searching for a minimum (searching for a maximum is similar) of a unimodal function. Unlike finding a zero, where two function evaluations with opposite sign are sufficient to bracket a root, when searching for a minimum, three values are necessary. The golden-section search is an efficient way to progressively reduce the interval locating the minimum. The key is to observe that regardless of how many points have been evaluated, the minimum lies within the interval defined by the two points adjacent to the point with the least value so far evaluated.

The diagram above illustrates a single step in the technique for finding a minimum.

The next step in the minimization process is to "probe" the function by evaluating it at a new value of x, namely . Thus, in either case, we can construct a new narrower search interval that is guaranteed to contain the function's minimum.

Probe point selection

The golden-section search requires that these intervals be equal. If they are not, a run of "bad luck" could lead to the wider interval being used many times, thus slowing down the rate of convergence. To ensure that b = a + c, the algorithm should choose .

Eliminating c from these two simultaneous equations yields

or

where φ is the golden ratio:

The appearance of the golden ratio in the proportional spacing of the evaluation points is how this search algorithm gets its name.

Termination condition

Any number of termination conditions may be applied, depending upon the application. The interval ΔX = X4 − X1 is a measure of the absolute error in the estimation of the minimum X and may be used to terminate the algorithm. The value of ΔX is reduced by a factor of r = φ − 1 for each iteration, so the number of iterations to reach an absolute error of ΔX is about ln(ΔX/ΔXo) / ln(r) where ΔXo is the initial value of ΔX. 

Because smooth functions are flat (their first derivative is close to zero) near a minimum, attention must be paid not to expect too great an accuracy in locating the minimum.

Algorithm 

Note! The examples here describe an algorithm that is for finding the minimum of a function. For maximum, the comparison operators need to be reversed.

Iterative algorithm

 Specify the function to be minimized, f(x), the interval to be searched as {X1,X4}, and their functional values F1 and F4.
 Calculate an interior point and its functional value F2. The two interval lengths are in the ratio c : r or r : c where r = φ − 1; and c = 1 − r, with φ being the golden ratio.
 Using the triplet, determine if convergence criteria are fulfilled. If they are, estimate the X at the minimum from that triplet and return.
 From the triplet, calculate the other interior point and its functional value. The three intervals will be in the ratio c:cr:c.
 The three points for the next iteration will be the one where F is a minimum, and the two points closest to it in X.
 Go to step 3

"""Python program for golden section search.  This implementation
   does not reuse function evaluations and assumes the minimum is c
   or d (not on the edges at a or b)"""
import math

gr = (math.sqrt(5) + 1) / 2

def gss(f, a, b, tol=1e-5):
    """Golden-section search
    to find the minimum of f on [a,b]
    f: a strictly unimodal function on [a,b]

    Example:
    >>> f = lambda x: (x-2)**2
    >>> x = gss(f, 1, 5)
    >>> print("%.15f" % x)
    2.000009644875678

    """
    c = b - (b - a) / gr
    d = a + (b - a) / gr
    while abs(b - a) > tol:
        if f(c) < f(d):  # f(c) > f(d) to find the maximum
            b = d
        else:
            a = c

        # We recompute both c and d here to avoid loss of precision which may lead to incorrect results or infinite loop
        c = b - (b - a) / gr
        d = a + (b - a) / gr

    return (b + a) / 2

"""Python program for golden section search.  This implementation
   reuses function evaluations, saving 1/2 of the evaluations per
   iteration, and returns a bounding interval."""
import math

invphi = (math.sqrt(5) - 1) / 2  # 1 / phi
invphi2 = (3 - math.sqrt(5)) / 2  # 1 / phi^2

def gss(f, a, b, tol=1e-5):
    """Golden-section search.

    Given a function f with a single local minimum in
    the interval [a,b], gss returns a subset interval
    [c,d] that contains the minimum with d-c <= tol.

    Example:
    >>> f = lambda x: (x-2)**2
    >>> a = 1
    >>> b = 5
    >>> tol = 1e-5
    >>> (c,d) = gss(f, a, b, tol)
    >>> print(c, d)
    1.9999959837979107 2.0000050911830893
    """

    (a, b) = (min(a, b), max(a, b))
    h = b - a
    if h <= tol:
        return (a, b)

    # Required steps to achieve tolerance
    n = int(math.ceil(math.log(tol / h) / math.log(invphi)))

    c = a + invphi2 * h
    d = a + invphi * h
    yc = f(c)
    yd = f(d)

    for k in range(n - 1):
        if yc < yd:  # yc > yd to find the maximum
            b = d
            d = c
            yd = yc
            h = invphi * h
            c = a + invphi2 * h
            yc = f(c)
        else:
            a = c
            c = d
            yc = yd
            h = invphi * h
            d = a + invphi * h
            yd = f(d)

    if yc < yd:
        return (a, d)
    else:
        return (c, b)

Recursive algorithm

public class GoldenSectionSearch {
    public static final double invphi = (Math.sqrt(5.0) - 1) / 2.0;
    public static final double invphi2 = (3 - Math.sqrt(5.0)) / 2.0;

    public interface Function {
        double of(double x);
    }

    // Returns subinterval of [a,b] containing minimum of f

    public static double[] gss(Function f, double a, double b, double tol) {
        return gss(f, a, b, tol, b - a, true, 0, 0, true, 0, 0);
    }
    private static double[] gss(Function f, double a, double b, double tol,
                                double h, boolean noC, double c, double fc,
                                boolean noD, double d, double fd) {
        if (Math.abs(h) <= tol) {
            return new double[] { a, b };
        }
        if (noC) {
            c = a + invphi2 * h;
            fc = f.of(c);
        }
        if (noD) {
            d = a + invphi * h;
            fd = f.of(d);
        }
        if (fc < fd) {  // fc > fd to find the maximum
            return gss(f, a, d, tol, h * invphi, true, 0, 0, false, c, fc);
        } else {
            return gss(f, c, b, tol, h * invphi, false, d, fd, true, 0, 0);
        }
    }

    public static void main(String[] args) {
        Function f = (x)->Math.pow(x-2, 2);
        double a = 1;
        double b = 5;
        double tol = 1e-5;
        double [] ans = gss(f, a, b, tol);
        System.out.println("[" + ans[0] + "," + ans[1] + "]");
        // [1.9999959837979107,2.0000050911830893]
    }
}

import math

invphi = (math.sqrt(5) - 1) / 2  # 1 / phi
invphi2 = (3 - math.sqrt(5)) / 2  # 1 / phi^2

def gssrec(f, a, b, tol=1e-5, h=None, c=None, d=None, fc=None, fd=None):
    """Golden-section search, recursive.

    Given a function f with a single local minimum in
    the interval [a,b], gss returns a subset interval
    [c,d] that contains the minimum with d-c <= tol.

    Example:
    >>> f = lambda x: (x-2)**2
    >>> a = 1
    >>> b = 5
    >>> tol = 1e-5
    >>> (c,d) = gssrec(f, a, b, tol)
    >>> print (c, d)
    1.9999959837979107 2.0000050911830893
    """

    (a, b) = (min(a, b), max(a, b))
    if h is None:
        h = b - a
    if h <= tol:
        return (a, b)
    if c is None:
        c = a + invphi2 * h
    if d is None:
        d = a + invphi * h
    if fc is None:
        fc = f(c)
    if fd is None:
        fd = f(d)
    if fc < fd:  # fc > fd to find the maximum
        return gssrec(f, a, d, tol, h * invphi, c=None, fc=None, d=c, fd=fc)
    else:
        return gssrec(f, c, b, tol, h * invphi, c=d, fc=fd, d=None, fd=None)

Fibonacci search

A very similar algorithm can also be used to find the extremum (minimum or maximum) of a sequence of values that has a single local minimum or local maximum. In order to approximate the probe positions of golden section search while probing only integer sequence indices, the variant of the algorithm for this case typically maintains a bracketing of the solution in which the length of the bracketed interval is a Fibonacci number. For this reason, the sequence variant of golden section search is often called Fibonacci search.

Fibonacci search was first devised by Kiefer (1953) as a minimax search for the maximum (minimum) of a unimodal function in an interval.

See also
 Ternary search
 Brent's method
 Binary search

References

Golden ratio
Fibonacci numbers
Optimization algorithms and methods
Articles with example Java code
Articles with example Python (programming language) code
Search algorithms